Leövey Klára Gimnázium (in English: Klara Leovey High School) is a high school in Budapest, Hungary. Students attend the school from age 14 to age 18.

History of the school 
The predecessor of the school, Ranolder Institute was founded by Ranolder János, the bishop of Veszprém at the time, in order to give Ferencváros, which was mainly inhabited by German natives in those days, an institute to educate women in Hungarian. The school in charge of the Daughters of Charity was gradually growing receiving girls with the intention to study from all over the country. After the nationalisation in 1948/49 the school became a training (secondary) school for primary school teachers, then taking up the name Leövey Klára in 1955, it was turned into a high school.

The framework of education in the school 
In the regular department the students between the age of 14 and 18 take part in a 4 and 5 year school course/education.

This is a school of „the second chance” too, because at the department of adult education there is a chance for youngsters or young adults who for some reason could not obtain a secondary education certificate, are given the chance to get it within a night school or correspondent course system without giving up their jobs and starting a regular (daytime) secondary school course.

The school also offers a practice-oriented 1- or 2- year-long course based on the requirements of the secondary education certificate which gives a qualification to those who do not wish to or temporarily cannot continue their studies at a further education college or university.

In the school year 2008/2009 there are 650 students attending the regular and 210 students the adult department of the school.

Innovative School 
This school has been a member of the Network of European Innovative Schools since June 2003. This gives the opportunity of trying out new pedagogical methods and tools and of joining/participating international programs.

Modernising contents in the educational work 
In the educational work environmental education has a prominent role. Students learn about the importance of environmental protection at elective extra lessons, through doing project work and educational trips. A new project on environmental protection, which is on the way to be state-credited, is being tested at the moment at this school.

The European Language Portfolio which help students to keep track of their language learning process was introduced in 2003. The Portfolio is in accordance with the Common European Framework and 
 is an ideal tool to give the parents a clear picture of their children’s headway and 
 develops self-assessment and 
 improves language awareness of the students as well.

The school was one of the first high schools in Hungary to introduce the teaching of the subject ’Introduction to Economics in’ its curriculum as an elective extra lesson. Within the scope of the subject students could join a student enterprise program called Young Enterprise to gain experience on running a business. From the school year 2005/2006 students have the opportunity of receiving the renowned Unified European Economic Certificate (EBC*L).

As the result of the development made in the last few years the teaching of the subject ’Moving picture and Media’ has been introduced as an elective course and for students specialising in it, within the framework of which the students get to know the basics of analysing moving pictures and current phenomena of the media. 
This school is a pioneer in using information and communication technologies. In this field traditions go back to 1983.  These technologies are used in the background work of both teachers and students and in projects work as well.

Leövey Klára Secondary Grammar School in projects 

With the coordination of the European schoolnet the school has been participating in the e-learning research and development work of the Celebrate project which has been going on since 2002 with nine Hungarian schools (including Leovey Klara High School) taking part in it. Teachers have been creating and testing e-learning resource materials to be used through the Internet. 
The school is part of the Sulinet Digital Knowledge Base the aim of which is to integrate informatics, learning and teaching materials into the process of school learning.
The SCALE project is an EU sponsored project with 6 countries participating. It aims at developing an Internet-based method which can help to develop students’ argumentative skills in discussions and introduce the method of learning with the help of discussions to them.
Within the ZORKA 2004 project, with the other schools involved in the  Innovative School Network, the school has been developing digital teaching and learning resource materials to be used in teaching natural sciences.
In the school year 2005/2006 the ESZTER project was organised by Sulinet Program Office (Programiroda), with innovative schools taking part, within which students were exploring the ethnic, language, religious and cultural heterogeneity of the EU countries. 
With the HEFOP 3.1.3. project the school can take part in the development program entitled ’Preparation for  Competence-based Teaching’.  All the 9-form students in this school are involved in it. 
The participation in the Socrates/Comenius school development program financed by the European Committee gives students the chance to improve their sense of solidarity and empathy. It also helps them to explore and respect the heterogeneity of European Culture and social traditions. This institute is the coordinator for 6 schools in the 3-year project entitled “For a European School of Solidarity” which aims at helping the participants to learn and cohabit with heterogeneity.

Specialities 
Students in the 9th and 10th form learn the subjects of their own interest, which they specialise in, in a higher number of lessons. At the beginning of the 11th form they can revise their former choice and make a new one choosing another elective subject to orient themselves towards another aim in their future career. 
Besides the modern pedagogical methods used in the school, the students are attracted by the friendly atmosphere of the institution as well. The extra curricular activities also have an important role to contribute to this good atmosphere.
It is not only the cultural programs which are of great interest to students but they show interest in acting, sports activities and hiking as well.
The students’ self-government operates within a special independent framework.
The excellent atmosphere of the school is also due to the most modern way of keeping contact between parents and the school as well as students and teachers through the internet. This new type of “interpersonal” contact is operated through the Moodle framework and it makes the educational and pedagogical work of teachers much more effective.
The school has owned a certificate of quality management based on the QPSA model since 1999. For the sake of the permanent improvement the school is continuously processing the feedback (measurements, competition results, data of enrolment, final exam results) and survey the indicators of the level of satisfaction of partners (of parents and students) in the educational and pedagogical process. 
As the appreciation of the high quality of the work, the name of the school gets referred to more and more frequently in the leading organs of pedagogical literature.

External links
Official site

Gymnasiums in Hungary
Education in Budapest